Mohammed Illias Sahadulla (born 4 June 1945) is an Indian physician and a developer of healthcare facilities in Kerala. He is the Founder Chairman & Managing Director of KIMS Healthcare Management Limited (also known as KIMS Group).

Early life and education 
Mohammed Illias Sahadulla was born in 1945 in the Indian city of Thiruvananthapuram from the state of Kerala. He did his MBBS in 1968 and completed his MD in General Medicine in 1973 from Medical College Hospital, Trivandrum. Subsequently, he became a Fellow of Royal College of Physicians, Ireland and London in 1999 and 2006 respectively. He has also acquired MBA from University of Hull, UK.

Career
Sahadulla started his career as an assistant professor of Internal Medicine at Medical College Hospital, Calicut, Kerala and later worked as Registrar in General Medicine in Colchester and Dudley Road Hospital, Birmingham. In the year 1975, he joined the medical department of Saudi Arabian American Oil Company as a physician and held the position of Senior Consultant Physician for more than a decade.

Awards and recognitions
Sahadulla has been nominated for the Padma Shri Awards in 2016. He received the title of National Ambassador by the Anti-Narcotics Council of India (a branch of UN India) for their campaign 'No-drugs Communities'. In 2013, he received the Lions Club Excellence Award and Business Excellence Award from Chamber of Commerce in the year 2010. He is the recipient of CSR award from Trivandrum Management Association 2012. He also received the Management Leadership Award from Trivandrum Management Association in the year 2008.

Memberships
 National Health Review Committee constituted by Confederation of Indian Industries (CII) & Indian Healthcare Foundation (IHCF).
 President of Association of Advanced Specialty Healthcare Institutions (AASHI). 
 Founder member of Healthcare Sector Skill Council (HSSC)
 Board Advisor to Hemas Group of Hospitals, Sri Lanka.
 British Medical Association - Member 
 Indian Medical Association - Member 
 Royal College of Physicians of Ireland – Member 
 Royal College of Physicians of London –  Member and MRCP Examiner 
 Theosophical Society of England – Member 
 High Level CII Delegation to Improve Bilateral Relations – Member and Speaker
 Association of Physicians of India – Life Member 
 Critical Care Association of India – Life Member 
 Kerala International Centre – Life Member 
 Chamber of Commerce – Executive Committee Member 
 Trivandrum Management Association – Executive Committee Member 
 Aramco Employees Association - President for two years 
 Aramco Tennis Association, Rastanura - President for two years
 Aramco Badminton Association - President for several years
 Trivandrum Medical Association - President and subsequently Executive Committee member
 Trivandrum District Badminton Association - President
 Hospital Management Asia Speaker
 AHPI (Kerala Chapter) - President
 FICCI Steering Committee member

Contributions to society
He initiated KIMS Charitable Trust through which to date approx. INR 30 Crores have been discounted for the needy and poor patients. The "Hrudaya Spandanam", scheme for 150 economically backward heart patients, the "Guruvandanam" scheme for 100 retired school teachers, the "Touch a life Foundation" for poor cancer patients, the Cancer Prevention Group, Satellite Clinics in peripheral areas, over 600 medical camps, health talks, continuing medical education programs, training programs and environmental friendly practices at KIMS, are some of his contributions to society. As the current President of the Trivandrum Medical College Alumni Association (TMCA) he has taken initiatives in improving the infrastructure and academic quality of the college and hospital to help the patients and medical students.

References

1945 births
Living people
Alumni of the University of Hull